Wbaldino Acosta (1938 – 1 August 2007) was an Argentine politician who served as Governor of his province of San Juan.

Biography
Acosta was a lawyer and was active in public life, heading the provincial boxing federation in 1978. In 1971 he had joined the important San Juan party, the Partido Bloquista, led by Leopoldo Bravo who served several times as Governor and Senator. He became active in politics in 1981 becoming a provincial minister, then in 1983 the Chief of Police. In 1987, Acosta was elected vice-governor of San Juan with Carlos Gómez Centurión; the 1991 gubernatorial election, however, was won by the Justicialist Party.

On 16 May 1999, Acosta was elected once again as vice-governor of San Juan accompanying the Renewal Crusade party's Alfredo Avelín who won with 55%, heading the list of the Alliance for Work, Justice and Education which would win the Presidency of Argentina later the same year. Avelín's period in office was marked by economic turbulence and public unrest in San Juan, like the country as a whole. By 2001, provincial employees were not paid and the province had become insolvent.

In 2002, Avelín was impeached and deposed as governor by a majority of provincial deputies following massive demonstrations. Acosta's party had joined the opposition parties in deposing Avelín and Acosta was made governor. He stood in the subsequent 2003 election but came third behind José Luis Gioja of the Justicialist Party. He subsequently opposed his party's decision to back Gioja and the national government of Néstor Kirchner.

Acosta died aged 69 in 2007 following a brain haemorrhage. He had married Teresita Beatriz Zapata in 1970 and had three children.

Notes

References

1938 births
2007 deaths
People from San Juan Province, Argentina
Argentine people of Spanish descent
Governors of San Juan Province, Argentina
Vice Governors of San Juan Province, Argentina
20th-century Argentine lawyers